Kala Bhushana Bandusena Samarasinghe, popularly known as Bandu (බන්දු සමරසිංහ, born 22 November 1952), is an actor in Sri Lankan cinema, theater and television. One of the most popular comedians in Sinhala cinema, Bandu is best known for comedy roles in several blockbuster film franchises such as Re Daniel Dawal Migel, Cheriyo, Jolly Halo as well as Somy Boys. In addition to acting, he also worked as a director, scriptwriter, singer, lyricist and producer. In April 2022, he was appointed as the Consul General in Milan, Italy replacing Neela Wickramasinghe who died while serving in the relevant position. However, it was revealed that he himself would not accept as the Consul General in Milan due to disappointment of the government’s conduct.

Personal life
Bandu was on born on 22 November 1952 in a family of five children. His father Kegalle Podi Mahaththya (1917-1980) was a mechanic and his mother Lellagaha Goda Iskole Hamine (1925-2007) was a teacher. His preschool education came through St. Savior Convent and secondary education by St. Mary's College, Kegalle. He is a B-grade singer in Sri Lanka Broadcasting Corporation.

Bandu is married to Swarna Samarasinghe where the couple has two daughters; Rasoga and Hiranga, and one son, Kumara Kanchana, who is also an actor and singer. Kanchana and Rasoga also acted in Bandu's fourth cinema direction Peeter One. In mid 2018, Kanchana released his first music video Sura Dewliye.

Career

as an actor
Starting as early as 1971 at the age of 17 or so, Bandu started his cinema career with Sadahatama Oba Mage. He acted in slapstick comedies along with Freddie Silva in the 1980s. He acted in more than 98 Sri Lankan films up to 2018. Almost 95 percent of the films were comedies and very few were dramas.

He started stage drama career with the play No Problem directed by Nilanthi Dhammika and produced by Niroshan Devapriya. Its maiden show was staged at Nithyanjal in Kandana on February 26, 2000.

Bandu Samarasinghe and Tennison Cooray were able to build a formidable comic duo combination and both of them act number of films together such as Ra Daniyel Dawal Mige, Cheriyo, Kolompoor, Somy Boys, James Bond and Thank You Berty. Bandu acted several iconic roles in Sinhala cinema such as "Daniel" in Ra Daniel Dawal Migel, "Marmite" in Cheerio Doctor and "Ikke Karolis" in political comedy Parliament Jokes. In 2019, he was awarded as the best actor in a comic role in Derana Film Awards.

In 2018, Tennison acted in the film Yama Raja Siri with Bandu for the first time in 10 years.

As a director
Before his comedy partner, Tennyson Cooray moved to direction in 2013, Bandu started to showcase his talents in direction. His first direction film Rodaya released in 1995 and gained much attraction. In 1997, he made the film Pemmal Mala and then Left Right Sir in 2004. In 2010, he made his maiden television serial Dara Garaj which gained huge popularity.

In 2013, Bandu directed the comedy blockbuster Peter One where he introduced his son Kanchana and second daughter Rasoga into silver screen. The shooting work began on August 5, 2012 and the shooting was completed on November 1, 2012. Permission for the film was obtained from the Board of Directors on December 18. The media briefing was held on December 20, 2012. The film was screened on May 10, 2013.

Television
His first teledrama acting came under his own direction, through Dara Garaj. And he acted few teledramas like Roy de Silva's Tarzan Ape Man, Giriraj Kaushalya's Nana Kamare, Sikuru Lanthe and Nishantha Weerasinghe's Dankuda Banda. His first "Bandu Live In Concert" was held on 10 July 2005 and after 11 years, he performed his next Bandu Live In Concert on 27 August 2016 at BMICH.

Bandu along with Tennison and Yureni Noshika acted as hosts for Hiru Mega Star season 2. He also hosts the chat program Talks With Bandu telecast by Hiru TV.

Filmography

Director and actor

Songs

Awards 
 Creative Performance - Sarasaviya Awards - 2001
 SLIM Nelson Peoples Award - 2006
 Kala Bhushana - 32rd Kala Bhushana Awards - 2016
 Signis Sri Lanka Saluation - 2015 
 Derana Film Awards - Best Comedy Role - 2019

References

External links
 IMDb
 බුදු සන්තෝ ඒවා නිකං ඇඟ වෙව්ලන වැඩ - ‘මයි නේම් ඉස් බන්දු’ සමඟ රට වටා විහිළු බෙදන බන්දු සමරසිංහ
 යළි රඟපායිද නැද්ද?
 බන්දු ඔබ පැවසුවේ ඇත්ත ය
 බන්දු... බන්දු සමඟ
 කලකට පසු බන්දු-ටෙනී
 අපි දෙන්නා අමනාප කරන්න සමහරු පෙළඹුණේ
 විකට ශිල්පීන්ගේ පුදුම විහිළු
 තමන් අනුකරණය කිරීම නවතන ලෙස බන්දු කළ ඉල්ලීම සලකා බැලේ
 නිෂ්පාදකවරු එක්ක කතා වුණාලු බන්දු, ටෙනි දාලා චිත්‍රපට දුවවන්න බෑ කියලා – බන්දු සමරසිංහ
 දන්න කියන නළු නිළියන්ගේ වෙනස්ම ආකාරයේ රඟපෑම්
 බන්දු - ටෙනී විරසකයි කීම බොරුවක්

Sri Lankan male film actors
Sinhalese male actors
Living people
1950 births